Scrappy-Doo is a fictional Great Dane puppy created by Hanna-Barbera Productions in 1979. He is the nephew of the titular Scooby-Doo. Scrappy has appeared in a number of the various incarnations of the Scooby-Doo cartoon series. Lennie Weinrib provided his voice for one season in 1979, and from 1980 on it was performed by Don Messick (who also voiced Scooby). In the first live-action theatrical film, video games, and commercials, he was voiced by Scott Innes, and portrayed by Rowan Atkinson.

He was created to save the show's ratings which by 1979 had begun to sink to the point of cancellation threats from ABC, who were considering choosing between Scooby-Doo and an unnamed pilot from Ruby-Spears Enterprises which Mark Evanier had also written.

History

Hanna-Barbera

Precursors
Though Scrappy officially debuted in the fall of 1979, there may have been hints of his existence in 1969, as he "...bore a resemblance to Spears's and Ruby's initial idea for a feisty little dog", which was one of the early ideas for the Scooby-Doo character himself, along with the "big cowardly dog" ultimately chosen.

Scrappy also bears a significant resemblance to his creator, Joe Barbera, in certain respects: New York City is the hometown of both Scrappy's father never appears in any series, even for his son's birth, and Joe Barbera's father abandoned the family when Barbera was fifteen. Scrappy's relationship with his Uncle Scooby took far more precedence than the absent father, as did Joe Barbera's maternal uncle Jim fill in as a father.

After hearing Joe Barbera's description of the character, writer Mark Evanier, was significantly reminded of the Looney Tunes character Henery Hawk, and incorporated what he knew of said character into the script.

Development
Scrappy's creation officially began in 1978, when Scooby-Doo's ratings were sinking to the point of cancellation threats from ABC.

Duane Poole, a story editor for the first series Scrappy appeared in, recalled it as a lively time, with many new ideas and some new blood being hired with the desperation to revive Scooby-Doo, which had been a cash-cow in its glory days.

Mel Blanc was the first choice to voice Scrappy, given his connection to Henery Hawk, but wanted too much money to voice the part. Frank Welker, the voice of Fred Jones, auditioned to voice Scrappy as a dual role during the character's development (one of several voice actors considered for the role) and coined the catchphrase "Puppy Power" during his audition. He would later change this to "Monkey Muscle" for the similar Donkey Kong Jr. character he would voice for TV's Saturday Supercade. The next choice was Messick, who was seen as giving the best audition, but still deemed "the wrong voice". Afterwards, other well-known cartoon voice artists were considered or suggested: Daws Butler, Paul Winchell, Marilyn Schreffler, Howard Morris, Dick Beals and Marshall Efron. Ultimately, Lennie Weinrib was chosen.

Warner Brothers

Live-action Scooby-Doo movie (2002) 
Scrappy was first included in an early draft of what would become Scooby-Doo (2002), in around March 2000. Though he did not physically appear, and was only mentioned by Shaggy and Scooby offhand and was heavily implied to have been put to sleep for undisclosed reasons. James Gunn first acknowledged his involvement in April 2000. Other original ideas for the villain included the Old Man Smithers, the villain from the beginning of the film. Concept art for Scrappy turning into a monster was drawn in 2001. According to the DVD commentary, choosing the villain of the movie was a problematic part of the production, as the makers did not feel comfortable simply giving the role to an "anonymous monster", and that the ending was in "bits and pieces" and the "confinements forced them to be creative." "There is a Scrappy because he exists in the cartoon, so we have to acknowledge him," Gunn stated in an interview shortly before the film's release.

Ultimately, in the final film, Scrappy is revealed to be the villain, in an attempt to get revenge on Mystery Inc. after they kicked him out. Despite previously stating that he felt that "kids didn’t care", Gunn later admitted with some dismay that younger viewers had reacted poorly to the development, admitting he had not understood how popular Scrappy was with five and six-year-olds. "I still think it was funny that Scrappy was the villain", he explained in an interview with Cinefantastique, "but there are kids out there who were really upset."

Performers
 Lennie Weinrib (1979–1980; Scooby-Doo and Scrappy-Doo)
 Don Messick (1980–1988; Scooby-Doo and Scrappy-Doo, The New Scooby and Scrappy-Doo Show, Strong Kids, Safety Kids, The New Scooby-Doo Mysteries, The 13 Ghosts of Scooby-Doo, Scooby-Doo Meets the Boo Brothers, Scooby-Doo and the Ghoul School, Scooby-Doo and the Reluctant Werewolf)
 Scott Innes (1999–2012; The Scooby-Doo Project, Harvey Birdman: Attorney at Law, Scooby-Doo, video games, commercials, toys, various merchandise)
 J.P. Manoux (2002; Scrappy Rex in the live-action film)
 James Arnold Taylor (2007; Drawn Together)
 Dan Milano (2007; Robot Chicken)
 Tom Kenny (2019; Wacky Races)

Reception
Scrappy was initially seen as a "good idea" by Saturday Morning Review. Viewership seemed to react positively to Scrappy, as Scooby's ratings went up with Scrappy's arrival. The character continued to be a success for the next decade. Story editor Duane Poole noted, "Scrappy solved a lot of story problems. Before you had to get Shaggy and Scooby into dangerous situations—and there was no real easy way to get them there—with Scrappy, he, uh, picked them up and carried them there. He just charged in. He was just such the antithesis of what Scooby and Shaggy were. The dynamic was great fun to play."

Joe Ruby and Ken Spears seemed to have a less than positive view on the character. The co-founder of Ruby-Spears enterprises said, "Everyone was upset", though was unclear about whether this concerned business reasons (they had started their own company two years earlier) or personal creative reasons (considering that if Scooby had been canceled, then the last slot would have hit their show instead), starting when, in 1979, it looked a pilot of theirs would be renewed over Scooby's. Mark Evanier, who wrote said pilot, was hired impromptu to write Scrappy-Doo into a new pilot to renew interest in Scooby. As a result, Scooby was renewed over theirs, which was upsetting for them. "Scrappy would charge in and solve things, so he was useful, in that way. A lot of people made derogatory comments about it at the studio and you know you don't want to be saddled with something based on, you know, network [...] but I think I liked working with it most of those cartoons." Said Charles M. Howell, a writer who originally joined the franchise back on The New Scooby and Scrappy-Doo Show and continued to work on various iterations of the show until finally ending his tenure in the late '80s after penning the pilot episode for A Pup Named Scooby-Doo.

Tom Ruegger, stated, "It's a lot easier to love Scooby than it is to love Scrappy. But I don't have the problem with Scrappy that I have heard expressed by others. I suspect this is because I wasn't watching Scooby from the beginning, but rather, I came in and started catching up quite a while (a couple of years) after Scrappy had made his debut. Hey, they'd been messing with Scooby's cast for years! Scooby Dum. All those nasty celebrity cameo Scooby movies. I dislike those things more than I dislike Scrappy. And, for what it's worth, at least Scrappy brings some energy to the table. He actually does have a personality, even though many find it obnoxious. [...] So, since I tend to love the characters with whom I work, I can say that I learned to love Scrappy, despite all his limitations." Casper Kelly, one of the writers of The Scooby-Doo Project also admitted to having Scrappy as being in his first memory of Scooby, as well as enjoying when the monsters were real over the traditional fake monster format.

In 1999, celebrating Scooby-Doo's thirtieth anniversary, several newspapers printed articles, some of which mentioned Scrappy. In an episode of the 2011 series Scooby-Doo! Mystery Incorporated, Scrappy appeared in a brief cameo when Fred and Daphne visited a museum celebrating their exploits, to which Fred claimed "we all promised each other that we would never speak of him". In 2020, Casper Kelly stated that many writers did not actually hate Scrappy, implying that it was a joke and mandate.

Appearances

Television series
 Scooby-Doo and Scrappy-Doo (1979–1980)
 The Richie Rich/Scooby-Doo Show (1980–1982)
 The Scooby & Scrappy-Doo/Puppy Hour (1982–1983)
 The New Scooby and Scrappy-Doo Show / The New Scooby-Doo Mysteries (1983–1984)
 Scary Scooby Funnies (package show) (1984–1985)
 The 13 Ghosts of Scooby-Doo (1985)
 Scooby's Mystery Funhouse (package show) (1985–1986)
 Scooby-Doo! Mystery Incorporated (2011) (cameo)

Films
 Scooby-Doo Meets the Boo Brothers (1987)
 Scooby-Doo and the Ghoul School (1988)
 Scooby-Doo! and the Reluctant Werewolf (1988)
 Scooby-Doo (2002)
 Scooby-Doo! and the Goblin King (2008) ("Easter egg" cameo)

Other appearances

Tabletop games
 Scooby-Doo Game (1980)
 Scooby-Doo and Scrappy-Doo Game (1983)
 Scooby-Doo: The Board Game (Deluxe Edition) (2021)

Books
 Scrappy co-starred in several of Horace Elias's tie-in novels, particularly 1980's Scooby-Doo In the Haunted House.
 Scooby-Doo, the 1995 Archie Comics series.
 He was the star of the 24th issue of the Cartoon Network Presents comic book series.
 Scrappy appears in the 2019 DC Comics comic book series Scooby Apocalypse.

Other television
At midnight, of October 31, 1999, Cartoon Network aired several promos over the gang's disappearance. One was a promo involving the gang being frightened of Scrappy. In an interview, the writers mention adding that bit because Scrappy's part in the marathon was coming up and they felt the need to work him in.
Around 2001, Cartoon Network aired a bumper titled "Scrappy Loses It" where Scrappy rants about how the newer Cartoon Cartoons was becoming more popular than him despite him being around longer as the Cartoon Cartoons enter the studio in the same order that their schedule aired on prime-time. The bumper ends with Scrappy saying "Not for me, not for me, man!" in reference to Cartoon Network's then-current slogan, "The Best Place for Cartoons".
 Scrappy made a quick "Easter Egg" appearance in the "Scoobynatural" episode of the TV series Supernatural.
 Scrappy was mentioned in the 2021 TV special Scooby-Doo, Where Are You Now!

Video games
 In 1991, Amiga released a game entitled Scooby-Doo and Scrappy-Doo where Scrappy was the main playable character and had to venture through various platforms to find Shaggy and Scooby, who had gone missing.
 In 1999, Cartoon Network released Scrappy Stinks, a game where the sole objective was to pelt Scrappy with a substance referred to as "smelly goo", but avoid hitting Shaggy and Scooby in the process.

References

External links
 "Scrappy Days", Mark Evanier's recollections of the creation of Scrappy-Doo
 The Scooby Story: The Facts on Scrappy

Anthropomorphic dogs
Child characters in television
Comedy film characters
Fictional amateur detectives
Fictional characters from Ohio
Fictional dogs
Hanna-Barbera characters
Male characters in animation
Scooby-Doo characters
Television characters introduced in 1979